Dünserberg is a municipality in the district of Feldkirch in the Austrian state of Vorarlberg.

At Dünserberg, there is an  broadcasting tower for FM and TV built of concrete.

Geography
Dünserberg is the smallest municipality in Vorarlberg. About 46 percent of the municipality is forest, and 20 percent is mountainous.

Population

References

Bregenz Forest Mountains
Cities and towns in Feldkirch District